The International Commission on Large Dams, or ICOLD, ( or CIGB) is an international non-governmental organization dedicated to the sharing of professional information and knowledge of the design, construction, maintenance, and impact of large dams.  It was founded in 1928 and has its central office in Paris, France.  It consists of 100 member national committees which have a total membership of about 10,000 individuals.
Official languages of the commission are English and French.

Definition

See also 
 United States Society on Dams is the member organization representing the US in ICOLD.
 British Dam Society is the United Kingdom national committee for ICOLD

References

External links 
 ICOLD official site: www.icold-cigb.net

International organizations based in France
Dam-related organizations
Civil engineering organizations